Duchy of Świecie and Lubiszewo was a duchy in Pomerelia centred around Świecie and Lubiszewo. It was formed in 1227 from the partition of the Duchy of Pomerelia and existed until between 1227 and 1233 when it was partitioned between duchies of Gdańsk, Lubiszewo and Białogarda.

History 
In 1227, after the death of Leszek the White, the High Duke of Poland, the Duchy of Pomerelia had achieved independence from the Kingdom of Poland. Following that, the duke of Pomerelia, Swietopelk II, had partitioned the county between himself and his brother, Warcisław I of Świecie, to whom he had given the Świecie and Lubiszewo. Wartisław I had died between 1227 and 1233. Following his death, his state was divided between Swietopelk II, who got the area of Świecie, Sambor II, who got the Duchy of Lubiszewo, and Racibor of Białogarda, who got Duchy of Białogarda.

Citations

Notes

References

Bibliography 
 Labuda Gerard, Mściwoj I, Słownik biograficzny Pomorza Nadwiślańskiego, vol. 3, Gdańsk. 1997.
 Bądkowski L., Samp W., Poczet książąt Pomorza Gdańskiego, Gdańsk. 1974.
 Śliwiński B., Poczet książąt gdańskich, Gdańsk. 1997.
 Józef Wójcicki, Dzieje Polski nad Bałtykiem. Warsaw. Książka i Wiedza. 1989

Former countries in Europe
Former monarchies of Europe
Pomeranian duchies
States and territories established in 1227
States and territories disestablished in the 1220s
States and territories disestablished in the 1230s
13th-century establishments in Europe
13th-century disestablishments in Europe